The Old Guard is a 2020 American superhero film directed by Gina Prince-Bythewood and written by Greg Rucka, based on his comic book of the same name. The film stars Charlize Theron, KiKi Layne, Matthias Schoenaerts, Marwan Kenzari, Luca Marinelli, Harry Melling, Veronica Ngo, and Chiwetel Ejiofor, and follows a team of immortal mercenaries on a revenge mission.

The Old Guard was released on July 10, 2020, on Netflix. It received generally positive reviews from critics, with praise for the action sequences and Theron's performance. A sequel is in production with Victoria Mahoney directing the film.

Plot
Andromache of Scythia ("Andy"), Booker, Joe, and Nicky are centuries-old warriors with unexplained regenerative healing abilities who use their vast experience to work as mercenaries, taking missions that help people. Breaking their rule of never working for the same employers twice, they accept a job from former CIA operative James Copley to rescue a group of kidnapped girls in South Sudan. During the mission, which proves to be a ruse, they are ambushed and killed. After quickly recovering and killing their attackers, they realize that Copley set them up and remotely filmed their regeneration.

Meanwhile, in Afghanistan, U.S. Marine Nile Freeman has her throat slit while taking down a military target during a house search, only to recover without a scratch. Later, she shares a disturbing dream with the other immortals, who are then alerted to her existence, as they experience dreams of any new immortals until found. Andy tracks down a confused Nile and extracts her from Afghanistan before military personnel can transfer her for further testing.

Copley shows the video of the ambush to pharmaceutical executive Steven Merrick, who sends operatives to capture the team. Andy brings Nile to a safe house in France, where she meets the rest of their team. The group shares some of their past and reveal that they are not truly immortal: their ability to heal eventually stops, without warning, which happened to a previous immortal, Lykon. She is also told about the female immortal Quynh, the first of Andy's comrades, who was captured, accused of witchcraft, and lost to them when cast somewhere into the sea in an iron maiden, and has been continually drowning ever since.

The group is ambushed by Merrick's forces; Joe and Nicky are captured while a seemingly deceased Booker is left behind. While Booker regenerates, Andy kills all of their assailants but is wounded and realizes she is not healing. Booker locates Copley, while Nile separates from the group to reunite with her family.

Andy and Booker confront Copley, only for Booker to betray Andy and shoot her, arguing that Merrick might find a way to end the immortality they have both grown weary of. As they are captured, however, Booker realizes that Andy is not healing. Copley has a change of heart when he sees that Merrick is willing to torture the immortals indefinitely to study them. Nile, having realized Booker sold out the group, arrives too late to intervene, but she convinces Copley to assist her in a rescue mission. She storms Merrick's London office and after she frees the rest of the immortals, they fight their way out through the rest of Merrick's security, with Nile saving Andy from Merrick by grabbing him and jumping out of a window, killing him.

As punishment for his betrayal, the group sentence Booker to loneliness - forbidding Booker from contacting them for 100 years. The rest of the group meets with Copley, who explains how his research revealed their past missions had a greater effect than they ever knew, with the descendants of people they had rescued going on to help the world in many different ways. With renewed faith in their existence, the group tasks Copley with maintaining their secret and finding missions where they can have an effect.

Six months later in Paris, a depressed and drunken Booker is astonished to find Quynh in his apartment.

Cast

Production 
In March 2017, Skydance Media picked up the rights to adapt the comic The Old Guard, written by Greg Rucka and illustrated by Leandro Fernandez, into a film.
Rucka's contract stipulated that a major scene highlighting the romance between the characters Joe and Nicky from the comic book must also be in the film adaptation.

In July 2018, they hired Gina Prince-Bythewood to direct with Rucka adapting his comic book to screenplay and Skydance's David Ellison, Dana Goldberg and Don Granger producing. With a budget of about $70 million, Prince-Bythewood became the first black woman to direct a big-budget comic book film. In March 2019, Netflix picked up worldwide rights to the film and agreed to finance it with Skydance. Charlize Theron joined the film and also produced with Beth Kono, A.J. Dix, Marc Evans and Skydance's David Ellison, Dana Goldberg, and Don Granger.

KiKi Layne was confirmed to star in the film after Netflix picked up the rights. In May 2019, Marwan Kenzari, Matthias Schoenaerts, and Luca Marinelli joined the cast of the film. In June 2019, Chiwetel Ejiofor, Harry Melling, and Veronica Ngo joined the cast of the film. At Ngo's request, details of her character were changed from the comic book. In an interview, Rucka said, "When Veronica was cast, she said I'm not Japanese, I'm Vietnamese. [Director Gina Prince-Bythewood] reached out to me and said 'Can we accommodate that?' and I was like, 'Absolutely.' [...] Noriko becomes Quynh, Quynh is now Vietnamese. It really was as simple as wanting to honor that, and be respectful of that". The other change to the character was the character's death. "In the comic, Quynh/Noriko is washed overboard during a storm rather than deliberately drowned. According to Rucka, that was partially a logistical change to save money. [...] But Quynh’s new 'death,' solidified by Prince-Bythewood’s suggestion of the iron maiden imagery, served an important narrative and tonal role as well".

Principal photography for the film began in Europe in mid-May 2019. Filming took place in Morocco and the United Kingdom, including at Shepperton Studios in England.  Sandwich in Kent was used as a double for the French town Goussainville. Sandwich's Discovery Park doubled as Merrick Pharmaceutical headquarters throughout the film. Filming in the famous pub Prospect of Whitby took place on July 10, 2019.

Volker Bertelmann and Dustin O'Halloran composed the film score. Lakeshore Records released the soundtrack on July 10, 2020, coinciding with the film streaming release.

Release
The Old Guard was released on July 10, 2020 on Netflix. It was the top-streamed item on the site over its first weekend. It ranked second and fourth the following two weekends.

On July 17, Netflix reported the film was on pace to be viewed by 72 million households over its first four weeks, among the top 10 most-successful original launches in the platform's history. That October, Netflix reported the actual figure to have been 78 million. In November, Variety reported the film was the seventh-most watched straight-to-streaming title of 2020 up to that point. In December, The A.V. Club reported that due to "the way Netflix operates, we don't even know whether The Old Guard is a hit in any measurable sense. Netflix itself claims that 78 million households have watched it, and I have no idea whether that's a good number".

Reception

Critical response 
The site's critics consensus reads: "The Old Guard is occasionally restricted by genre conventions, but director Gina Prince-Bythewood brings a sophisticated vision to the superhero genre - and some knockout action sequences led by Charlize Theron." At Metacritic, the film has a weighted average score of 70 out of 100, based on 45 critics, indicating "generally favorable reviews".

Kate Erbland of IndieWire gave the film a "B+" and said: "Steeped in hand-to-hand action... but with enough ballistic firepower to kit out a small civil war, every action sequence is more than awe-inspiring; they're necessary to the film itself. Superhero battles that are eye popping and narratively motivated? Oh, yeah." Owen Gleiberman of Variety called the film a "watchable franchise wannabe" and wrote: "Chunks of the picture are logy and formulaic (it dawdles on for two hours), but the director, Gina Prince-Bythewood (making a major lane change after Love & Basketball and The Secret Life of Bees), stages the fight scenes with ripe executionary finesse, and she teases out a certain soulful quality in her cast." Bob Chipman of The Escapist gave the film 7 out of 10 and said: "This is a clever, slick, progressive minded, yet also brutally violent, frequently kick ass action film" and that "they clearly want it to be a franchise, I'd certainly watch another one." Tom Breihan, for The A.V. Club, wrote, "The Old Guard is a superhero story; it’s just one of the many superhero stories that attempts to subvert superhero stories. [...] Though The Old Guard tackles superhero-movie clichés in interesting ways, it has more difficulty with the emerging conventions of the Netflix movie".

The film's portrayal of LGBT characters within the superhero genre was praised. Kevin Fallon of The Daily Beast said that The Old Guard "is the first movie with out gay superheroes, or the extremely (extremely) rare action film to feature queer characters and acknowledge their romance. [...] The sexuality of the characters is matter-of-fact and inconsequential to their ability to kick total-and-complete ass, yet also given the dignity of expressing and showing their love". Benjamin Lee, for The Guardian, wrote that "in 2020, it really shouldn't be such a big deal, but watching a form of unfettered queer love exist within the confines of a fantastical comic book adaptation, aimed at a wide audience, felt major to me." Anna Menta of Decider wrote: "I hadn't read The Old Guard comic, and I didn't know that writer Greg Rucka had stipulated in his contract that, whenever or however the film got made, it had to include that scene. So when it happened, well, it felt—and still does feel—like a huge freakin' deal. [...] It's just as passionate, just as charged, and just as sensual as Han and Leia, Peter and MJ, Peeta and Katniss, or any other heterosexual couple who's had a big kiss moment in an action movie over the years".

Accolades

Sequel

On the coda at the beginning of The Old Guards credits, Rucka said, "In case of sequel, break glass. It's very straightforward. You want another one? Here's a way to get into it". A sequel to the original graphic novel, The Old Guard: Force Multiplied, was published in 2019. Theron has expressed her interest in a second film, saying: "Let's have a little resting period, but just given the fact that all of us really want to do it, I'm sure when it's the right time, we'll start the conversation."

It was reported on January 27, 2021 that Netflix had greenlit a sequel. On August 26, it was announced that Victoria Mahoney would replace Prince-Bythewood as director for the sequel. Theron, Layne, Schoenaerts, Kenzari, Marinelli, Ngo, and Ejiofor are to reprise their respective roles from the original movie. In June 2022, Uma Thurman and Henry Golding were cast in undisclosed roles. At least part of the film is being shot at the Italian Cinecittà Studios, with a fire in August 2022 causing temporary disruption to filming.

References

External links 
 

2020 films
2020 action thriller films
2020 LGBT-related films
2020 action adventure films
2020s superhero films
American action adventure films
American action thriller films
American LGBT-related films
American superhero films
Gay-related films
Girls with guns films
LGBT-related superhero films
LGBT-related thriller films
Live-action films based on comics
Superhero thriller films
Films about immortality
War in Afghanistan (2001–2021) films
Films set in Afghanistan
Films set in France
Films set in London
Films set in Morocco
Films set in South Sudan
Films shot in Morocco
Films based on Image Comics
Films shot at Shepperton Studios
Films directed by Gina Prince-Bythewood
Films produced by Charlize Theron
Films scored by Dustin O'Halloran
Skydance Media films
English-language Netflix original films
Hugo Award for Best Dramatic Presentation, Long Form winning works
2020s English-language films
2020s American films